SS Bonnie Dundee was a 193/121 Gross register tons Australian steamship which sank after a collision with the steamship SS Barrabool off Lake Macquarie, New South Wales, Australia, on 10 March 1879.

History
Bonnie Dundee was built by Gourlay Brothers and Company, Dundee, Scotland, for George and Bruce Nicoll, Sydney, Australia, and was launched on 2 March 1877. Intended for trade from the Richmond River in New South Wales, Australia, she departed Dundee on 28 March 1877, traveling via the Suez Canal and stopping at Ceylon before and arriving in Cooktown, Australia, on Wednesday, 27 June 1877. She put into the Clarence River in New South Wales in mid-July 1877 and arrived in Sydney, New South Wales, on 18 July 1877.

While under charter, captained by John Alexander Stuart, Bonnie Dundee was cut in two in a collision with SS Barrabool, captained by John Readman Clark, which ran into her at about 8:00 p.m. on Monday, 10 March 1879. Bonnie Dundee sank within a few minutes. Five of her passengers did not survive the sinking. Barrabool suffered a gash in her port bow above the waterline.

Notes

1877 ships
Ships built in Dundee
Shipwrecks of the Central Coast Region
Maritime incidents in March 1879
1879 in Australia
Iron and steel steamships of Australia
Coastal trading vessels of Australia
1871–1900 ships of Australia
Merchant ships of Australia
Ships sunk in collisions
1879 disasters in Australia